The black-and-white warbler (Mniotilta varia) is a species of New World warbler, and the only member of its genus, Mniotilta. 
It breeds in northern and eastern North America and winters in Florida, Central America, and the West Indies down to Peru. This species is a very rare vagrant to western Europe.

Relative to other New World warblers, it is not well studied.

Description 
Wingspan ranges from 7.1-8.7 in (18-22 cm).

True to their name, black-and-white warblers are black and white in colour. Both sexes have black and white crowns with a white eyebrow, black streaking on a white belly, black wings with two white wing bars, a black tail, a black-and-white streaked back, streaky undertail coverts, and grey-black legs and feet. Breeding males have a black-and-white streaked throat and black cheek, while females have a grey cheek and a white-cream coloured throat and sides. First fall males are very similar to adult females in colour and patterning, while first fall females resemble to adult females but with less streaking and a more noticeable buffy wash. Juveniles are heavily spotted, and are similar to first fall individuals otherwise.

The summer male black-and-white warbler is boldly streaked in black and white, and the bird has been described as a flying humbug. Each wing is black with two white wing bars. Female and juvenile plumages are similar, but duller and less streaky than males.

This warbler can be confused with the blackpoll warbler (Setophaga striata). The blackpoll warbler is also black and white in its summer plumage, but has a solid black cap. The black-and-white warbler can also be confused behaviourally with the pine warbler (Setophaga pinus) and yellow-throated warbler (Setophaga dominica).

Taxonomy 
Linnaeus described the black-and-white warbler (Mniotilta varia) in 1766. This warbler is a species of New World warbler or wood warbler (family Parulidae), and is the only member of its genus due to its unique foraging adaptations.

It is known to hybridize with the cerulean warbler (Setophaga cerulea) and Blackburnian warbler (Setophaga fusca). The black-and-white warbler is thought to be closely related to the genus Setophaga.

No subspecies are known.

Etymology 
Vieillot mistranslated the first word,  as "moss". The specific varia is from the Latin , meaning "variegated".

Habitat and distribution 
The black-and-white warbler is a migratory species, breeding in North America and wintering in North and South America. It is typically found in deciduous forest in its breeding range, but becomes more of a habitat generalist in the non-breeding season.

Habitat 
The black-and-white warbler occupies a broad niche, and is found in a variety of habitats.

In its breeding habitat, it prefers mature forest, but will occupy successional and second growth forest. Preferred forest types include deciduous and mixed forest, and this warbler sometimes occupies swampy forest.

During migration, this species prefers forest to other land cover types and is frequently found in riparian areas.

In its wintering habitat, it can be found in a variety of land cover types, from mangroves to wet, dry, and cloud forest. It occupies both successional and mature forest. It has also been noted to winter in shade coffee plantations and gardens.

Males are territorial in both their summer and winter habitats.

Distribution 
The black-and-white warbler breeds in northern and eastern North America. It ranges from the Northwest Territories to the northwest and Newfoundland and Labrador to the northeast, to North Carolina to the southeast and Texas to the southwest. This species is migratory, wintering in Florida, Central America, and northern South America down to Peru. The IUCN estimates the extent of occurrence, or range, to be 11,500,000 km2.

This species occurs as a vagrant in Iceland, Ireland, Faeroes, and the UK.

Conservation status 
The IUCN classifies the black-and-white warbler as Least Concern due to its large range and population size. However, its population is decreasing. Habitat loss and degradation, especially forest fragmentation, are the main factors contributing to the species’ decline. If habitat loss continues, in either or both summer or wintering habitat, the species may continue to decline in the future. Pesticides such as fenitrothion and phosphamidon have contributed to the species’ decline in the 1970s, and others such as chlorinated hydrocarbons may continue to have an effect.

Behaviour

Vocalization 
The black-and-white warbler has a high-pitched song, described as a repeating  that is repeated at least 6 times in succession. It has a chip call as well as a  call that is sometimes given in flight.
It has two calls, a hard  and a soft, thin .

Diet 
This bird feeds on insects and spiders, and, unlike other warblers, forages like a nuthatch, moving up and down tree trunks and along branches.

The black-and-white warbler feeds in a manner similar to a nuthatch or a creeper. It forages on tree trunks and limbs to feed on insects below the bark's surface.  Its short legs and long hind toe are adaptations to this foraging method. The black-and-white warbler is unique among warblers in its time spent foraging on tree trunks and inner branches. This bird also gleans, like many warblers, for insects. Its diet is composed of insects and other arthropods, including lepidopteran larvae, beetles, ants, and spiders. During migration and breeding, this warbler relies heavily on lepidopteran larvae.

During migration, the black-and-white warbler sometimes joins mixed flocks to feed.

Reproduction 
It breeds in broadleaved or mixed forest, preferably in wetter areas. Black-and-white warblers nest on the ground, laying 4–5 eggs in a cup nest.

The black-and-white warbler is of the first warblers to arrive to its spring breeding grounds. In the southernmost range of its breeding habitat, it can begin breeding mid-April. Males are territorial and defend their territory, both by singing and chasing competitors away. When a female arrives in a male's territory, he pursues her in an effort to breed. The male may display by flapping his wings.

The nest is cup-shaped, often located on the ground among roots or against a tree, or in crevices on tree stumps. The species prefers to nest in damp areas. The nest is constructed with grassy material, bark, and dry leaves, and lined with softer material such as moss and hair. The female is responsible for most of the nest-building. The female lays 4-5 eggs, which are light brown and speckled with darker brown. The female begins incubating once the last or second-to-last egg is laid. Incubation lasts 10 to 12 days, and is done solely by the female. During incubation, the female is sometimes fed by the male.

Both parents care for the nestlings. The young fledge after 8 to 12 days, and stay around the nest while they improve their flight ability. During this time, the parents remain nearby.

This species generally produces one brood per year.

Black-and-white warbler nests are sometimes parasitized by the brown-headed cowbird (Molothrus ater).

Gallery

References

External links

 Black-and-white warbler (Mniotilta varia) – USGS Patuxent Bird Identification InfoCenter
 Black-and-white warbler species account – Cornell Lab of Ornithology
 Stamps at bird-stamps.org
 Black-and-white warbler vocalizations at Florida Museum of Natural History
 
 
 Black-and-white warbler sounds- Macaulay Library

black-and-white warbler
Birds of North America
Birds of the Caribbean
Birds of the Dominican Republic
Birds of Central America
Birds of South America
black-and-white warbler
Taxa named by Carl Linnaeus
Extant Late Pleistocene first appearances